Sedano's Supermarkets is the nation's largest Hispanic retailer and largest Hispanic-owned supermarket chain. With headquarters in Miami-Dade County. Sedano's employs approximately 3,000 associates and operates 35 stores across Florida in Miami-Dade, Broward, Orange, and Osceola counties. Sedano's is also the largest member of Associated Grocers of Florida, a wholesale grocery food cooperative. In 2020, Sedano's Supermarkets was named Food and Wine’s 20 Best Regional Supermarket Chains of All Time.

History

Early history 
In 1961, Cuban exile René Sedano opened the original Sedano’s store, a 4,000-square-foot (370 m2) bodega, in Hialeah, Florida. In 1962, a fellow Cuban exile, Armando Guerra Sr., acquired the store from Sedano and kept the name. After the Castro revolution, which culminated in 1959, Guerra, a successful banker and grocer in Cuba, exiled to Miami in 1961. In 1971, he encouraged Manuel  “Manolo” Herrán, who had married Guerra's niece, to move to Miami from Atlanta, Georgia, and assist with Sedano's operations. Herrán, a native of Spain, had moved to Sancti Spíritus, Cuba, as a teenager with his parents and siblings to escape Franco's regime. In 1967, at the age of 28, he fled Cuba and communism with his wife Nyria and their young family. They first landed in Atlanta. Upon moving to Miami, the Guerra and Herrán families began working together to grow the supermarket business. Their mission was to provide immigrants like themselves with the authentic flavors of their homeland.

Armando Guerra Sr. died in 1979. At that time, Manuel Herrán assumed control of the company and continued expanding the chain. He subsequently lured his brothers José, Ezequiel, and Antolín to join him in running the operation.

Management today 
In 2005, Manuel Herrán's son, Agustin Herrán, became president and CEO of Sedano's, and Manuel served as chairman of the board until his death on October 15, 2020. The management team includes José Herrán, Jr., who serves as chief operating officer, and Javier Herrán as chief marketing officer.

Market

Sedano's Supermarkets caters to shoppers who seek authentic ingredients for creating Hispanic and Latin dishes, plus ethnic household products and kitchen equipment and supplies. This niche sets them apart from traditional, non-Hispanic grocery stores, where such items may be hard to find or require a special order. Sedano's has onsite bakeries and kitchens that produce Hispanic baked goods throughout the day, such as Cuban bread, empanadas, croquetas, and pastelitos. Its custom-cuts meat department with an onsite butcher or “carnicero,” fish and seafood selection, prepared Latin meals, and onsite café specializing in cafeticos, attract Hispanic and non-Hispanic shoppers alike.

Besides packaged Hispanic foods and culturally common fresh fruits and vegetables, shoppers can also find typical American fare and products.

Florida expansion 
In 1994, Sedano's began expanding beyond Miami-Dade County when it opened its first store in Hollywood in Broward County. There are currently four locations in Broward, including Pembroke Pines and North Lauderdale. In January 2010, three Sedano's were opened in Central Florida after acquiring stores from Albertsons LLC. Two are in Orlando and the third location is in Kissimmee.

The chain has since grown to include stores spanning Miami-Dade, Broward, Orange, and Osceola counties. On November 6, 2019, the 35th location opened in Hialeah, making this the 10th store in Sedano's Supermarkets founding city of Hialeah, the sixth-largest city in the state.

Sedano’s Private Label 
In 2007, Sedano's Supermarkets launched its private label of products, which spans over 1,000 items as of 2021.

Online shopping, curbside pickup, and delivery service 
In 2018, Sedano's Supermarkets announced a partnership with Takeoff Technologies, a grocery software startup, to debut the first-ever automated, hyperlocal fulfillment center in Miami. This first-of-its-kind automated storage and retrieval system, built by Austrian logistics company KNAPP and designed by Takeoff, allowed Sedano's to expand into the grocery automation space. The robotic store can prepare over 1,500 items per hour, completing a 60-item order in 5 minutes. Shoppers who don't have the time or ability to shop in person can shop for groceries online at sedanos.com. Employees then bag the robotically retrieved groceries and load them into Sedano's trucks, and the groceries are delivered to select stores for pickup. Customers call upon arrival, and their groceries are carried out and placed in their vehicle. In February 2019, curbside pickup became available at even more stores.

Shipt 
To further expand its online ordering and delivery options, Sedano's announced its partnership with Shipt in May 2020. Sedano's customers can order groceries, including fresh produce, meats, deli items, and daily essentials, as well as beer and wine, via the Shipt app or at shipt.com, choose a delivery window time, and have the items delivered to their door. Customers must be at least 21 years old to order or accept alcohol deliveries and must present identification upon delivery.

Sedano’s Pharmacy 
In 1977, Sedano's Pharmacy was launched; Armando Guerra Jr., son of Armando Guerra Sr., was named president of Sedano's Pharmacy, having earned his degree in pharmacy at the University of Florida. Over the next three decades, Sedano's Pharmacy became a leading Hispanic drug retailer company with 11 locations from Homestead to Kissimmee, Florida.

In 2007, Navarro Discount Pharmacies, today part of CVS Health, acquired Sedano's Pharmacy for an undisclosed amount. The deal only included their 11 freestanding pharmacy locations, not the supermarkets. This acquisition allowed Sedano's to focus solely on its core grocery business.

Giving back to the Community

Tradition of Giving 
Sedano's Supermarkets has a history of giving back to the community. As part of Sedano's corporate social responsibility, Tradition of Giving was launched and is dedicated to supporting families in need across South Florida. As part of the initiative, more than 4,000 meal bundles are donated to families associated with 11 local organizations in November and December. The meal bundles include a turkey, rice, beans, mashed potatoes, and canned goods to feed a family of four.

Partner organizations for Sedano's Tradition of Giving include United Way of Miami-Dade, City of Hialeah, Miami-Dade County, City of Miami, Society of St. Vincent of Paul, The Saborido Foundation, Westchester Chamber of Commerce, and the City of Miami Neighborhood Enhancement Team. Donations also complete the Thanksgiving Day meals of local homeless shelters Camillus House and Lotus House.

Sedano's Tradition of Giving culminates with participation at CAMACOL's Annual Holiday Food Basket Drive, where 4,000 holiday meal bundles are distributed to families in need – an initiative Sedano's has supported for over 20 years.

Partnerships for Giving 
University of Miami Health System, Sylvester Comprehensive Cancer Center

Sedano's Supermarkets is a Community Partner of the University of Miami Sylvester Comprehensive Cancer Center and shares their common vision of a world free of cancer. In support, Sedano's helps to bring awareness and raise funds for cancer research, and the development of cutting-edge therapies and treatments for cancer patients. Sylvester is the only cancer center in South Florida to achieve National Cancer Institute designation.

Miami Cardiac & Vascular Institute

During February, designated nationally as American Heart Month, Sedano's partners with Baptist Health and Miami Cardiac & Vascular Institute (MCVI) to promote prevention and generate awareness of cardiovascular disease, a medical condition that highly impacts the U.S. Hispanic community. Since culinary traditions play an important role in Hispanic families, Sedano's, MCVI, and Baptist Health work together to provide healthy versions of recipe staples in Hispanic culture through interactive experiences and engagements of heart-healthy cooking demonstrations.

Autism Speaks

Since 2010, Sedano's Supermarkets has participated in the annual Autism Speaks Miami Walk Puzzle Pieces promotion, raising more than $450,000 for Autism Speaks. Participating Sedano's locations ask patrons to donate $1 to support the mission of enhancing understanding and acceptance of autism.

Sedano’s Brand 
In 2008, Sedano's hired República as its marketing, media and communications agency of record. Today renamed Republica Havas, the agency has worked with the Herrán family to evolve and grow the storied Sedano's brand across Florida. In 2020, República Havas led the development of the partnership between Sedano's, Versailles and La Carreta restaurants to help save hundreds of employees’ jobs due to the lockdowns across Florida because of the COVID-19 pandemic. The effort has won several awards, including a Gold ADDY Award from the American Advertising Federation.

Hurricane Efforts 
During hurricane season, customers can find a complimentary Hurricane Preparation Guide online and at each location. In preparation for hurricane season, Sedano's works with Florida Power & Light Company (FPL) and the Community Coalition, Inc., to voluntarily pack hurricane food kits for homebound senior citizens in Miami-Dade County. These hurricane food kits include non-perishable food items and water, along with a hurricane preparedness guide. In the aftermath of a hurricane, each store is equipped with emergency generators to accelerate reopening. The management works in conjunction with local and national organizations to provide relief in monetary donations, non-perishable goods, clothing, first-aid kits, and other needed supplies.

COVID-19 
As an “essential” business since the onset of the COVID-19 pandemic, Sedano's adjusted operations and policies as required by the Centers for Disease Control and Prevention (CDC), and local protocols. In addition to reinforcing heightened cleaning and sanitation procedures across all stores as needed, Sedano's provided safety gear, such as masks and gloves, to employees to help ensure their safety while at work. Customers are required to wear face coverings before entering and while shopping. Additional safety precautions were adopted, including providing hand sanitizer, plexiglass barriers at check-out stations, and limiting capacity as necessary. The 7:00am to 8:00am hour was also dedicated to customers 65 years of age or older and the community's immunocompromised members.

References

External links 

Sedano's relation to the Hispanic culture

Companies based in Miami
Retail companies established in 1961
Supermarkets of the United States
Economy of Hialeah, Florida
1961 establishments in Florida